Charles-Axel Guillaumot (Stockholm, February 1730 - Paris, 1807) was a French architect.

Life
Born in Stockholm to French parents, he entered the Académie royale d'architecture in 1770. He was made the first Inspecteur Général des Carrières de Paris when it was created by a decree of Louis XVI on 4 April 1777 and held the post until 1791 and then from 1796 until his death (the longest-ever holder of the office). In this role he mapped the mines of Paris to enable better maintenance of public roads and royal buildings (he did not look into ones on private land), to reduce the risk of cave-ins and to re-use them as ossuaries (becoming the Catacombs of Paris). He was also Administrateur de la manufacture des Gobelins. He was buried in the cimetière Sainte-Marguerite, whose remains were later transferred into the ossuaries he had helped create.

Main projects 
 1754-1756 : 3 barracks for the Swiss Guards :
 Rueil-Malmaison, what is now Guynemer, part of the Musée des Gardes suisses.
 the former caserne Charras in Courbevoie, inscribed as a 'Monument historique' in 1929, demolished in 1962, façade rebuilt in the park of the château de Bécon
 Saint-Denis, destroyed in 1962
 Caserne de Joigny, in what is now quartier Dubois-Thainville
 Abbot's Palace in Vezelay (destroyed in 1792)

References

Bibliography
  Caroline Girard, Charles-Axel Guillaumot (1730-1807), architecte et administrateur de la manufacture des Gobelins, Livraisons d'histoire de l'architecture, 2004, Volume 8, nº 1 (lire en ligne)
  Franck Charbonneau, Yann Arribart, Yves Jacquemard, Charles-Axel Guillaumot; Premier inspecteur des Carrières de Paris, ACP, 2013

External links
  Biographie de Guillaumot on Annales des mines
  Charles-Axel Guillaumot; premier Inspecteur des Carrières de Paris, édition ACP

1730 births
1807 deaths
Artists from Stockholm
Members of the Académie royale d'architecture
18th-century French architects
19th-century French architects